Zamal Nixon (born January 7, 1989) is an American professional basketball player who last played for Science City Jena of the German ProA. After a successful four years at the University of Houston, Nixon entered the 2011 NBA draft but was not selected in the draft's two rounds.

High school career
Nixon played high school basketball at Boys & Girls High School, in Brooklyn, New York.

College career
Nixon played college basketball for the Houston Cougars from 2007 to 2011. During his senior year, Nixon went on to average 10.3 points, 4.7 assists and 2.6 rebounds per game.

Professional career
After going undrafted in the 2011 NBA draft, Nixon joined Hertener Loewen. The following year, he joined  Nürnberg. For the 2013–14 season, he signed for WBC Raiffeisen Wels.

On August 15, 2014, Nixon signed with Phoenix Hagen after a successful tryout.

On August 31, 2015, Nixon signed with Greek club Lavrio. He went on to average 9.6 points, 2.1 rebounds, 3.5 assists and 1.5 steals in 21 games for Lavrio.

On June 26, 2016, he signed with Limoges CSP. On December 28, 2016, he left Limoges and returned to Lavrio for the rest of the season. On July 3, 2017, he re-signed with Lavrio for one more season.

In 2020, Nixon played seven games for Riesen Ludwigsburg, averaging 4.6 points, 1.6 rebounds and 1.9 assists per game. On September 21, 2020, Nixon signed with Promitheas Patras of the Greek Basket League. After two games, he signed with Science City Jena of the German ProA on October 12.

The Basketball Tournament (TBT)
In the summer of 2017, Nixon, for the second year, competed in The Basketball Tournament on ESPN for Team Fancy.  In three games, he averaged 10.0 points, 2.7 rebounds and 2.7 assists to help lead his team to the Super 16 Round where they lost 65-61 to Boeheim's Army; a team composed of Syracuse University basketball alum.  Nixon also competed in TBT in 2015 for the Sean Bell All-Star's.  In four games that summer, he averaged 13.5 points, 2.8 rebounds and 2.3 assists per game.

References

External links
Greek League Profile
Eurobasket.com Profile
RealGM.com Profile
FIBA.com Profile
Houston Cougars bio

1989 births
Living people
American expatriate basketball people in Austria
American expatriate basketball people in France
American expatriate basketball people in Germany
American expatriate basketball people in Greece
American men's basketball players
Basketball players from New York City
Flyers Wels players
Houston Cougars men's basketball players
Lavrio B.C. players
Limoges CSP players
Nürnberg Falcons BC players
Phoenix Hagen players
Point guards
Sportspeople from Brooklyn
USC Heidelberg players